The 1967 NCAA College Division football rankings are from the United Press International poll of College Division head coaches and from the Associated Press. The 1967 NCAA College Division football season was the tenth year UPI published a Coaches Poll in what was termed the "Small College" division. It was the eighth year for the AP version of the poll.

The AP poll did not include Win/Loss records in the weekly rankings. In the UPI poll, the Win/Loss records were published for the Top 10 in most weeks.  However, the Win/Loss records are provided in the AP poll section if the UPI also ranked the team.

Legend

The AP poll

The UPI Coaches poll

Notes

References

Rankings
NCAA College Division football rankings